The 1923–24 season was Blackpool F.C.'s 23rd season (twentieth consecutive) in the Football League. They competed in the 22-team Division Two, then the second tier of English football, finishing fourth.

Major Frank Buckley became the club's new manager prior to the start of the season, succeeding Bill Norman.

The team first began wearing tangerine for this season, after a recommendation from  referee Albert Hargreaves, who officiated a Holland-Belgium international match and was impressed by the Dutchmen's colours.

Harry Bedford was the club's top scorer for the third consecutive season, with 33 goals in all competitions (32 in the league and one in the FA Cup).

Bert Tulloch retired this season, after ten years of service for Blackpool, his only professional club.

Season synopsis
Draws were the common theme for the first month of Blackpool's League campaign, with five of them occurring in the first six games. They remained without a win until 29 September, a 2-0 scoreline at Crystal Palace.

October brought two wins, one draw and one defeat, and this inconsistency continued until March.

A 2–1 home victory over Brighton on 1 March started a run of four successive wins, which included nine goals by Jimmy Hampson, and they remained undefeated until 21 April.

A final-day win over Clapton Orient at Bloomfield Road secured fourth spot from Southampton.

Table

Transfers

In

Out

References

Blackpool F.C.
Blackpool F.C. seasons